A burglar is someone who commits the crime of burglary. Burglary is the act of breaking into a building.

Burglar or Cat Burglar may also refer to:

The Burglar (1917 film), an American silent drama film
  The Burglar (1929 film) by Dudley Murphy
Burglars (film), a 1930 German musical comedy film
The Burglar (1957 film), a 1957 American crime/thriller film
The Burglars, a 1971 French film
The Burglar (1972 film), a Dutch film
Burglar (film), a 1987 American comedy film
Cat Burglar, a 2022 interactive film
The Burglar (2016 film), an Israeli film
Burglary (Bottom), an episode of the British television sitcom Bottom
Burglar (comics), a fictional character in Marvel Comics